A mechanical stoker is a mechanical system that feeds solid fuel like coal, coke or anthracite into the furnace of a steam boiler. They are common on steam locomotives after 1900 and are also used on ships and power stations. Known now as a spreader stoker they remain in use today especially in furnaces fueled by wood pellets or refuse.

There are three types: the over feed, the under feed and the cross feed. The over feed delivers coal on to the top of the coals already in the furnace in the manner of a human working a shovel. The under feeder pushes fresh coal into the bottom of the furnace and then advances it upwards so that it mixes with the burning coal above.

The mechanical means used are, depending on design, combinations of the screw feed, the conveyor belt, the bucket chain, the paddle and the ram. Steam jets  from the boiler or a mechanical catapult may also be used to throw coal into the far reaches of the furnace.

Use in steam locomotives 
The confined working conditions of a locomotive footplate meant that the earliest development of the stoker took place in this application. Designers sought  to maximise power output in the locomotive by feeding coal at a rate faster than the fireman could shovel.

In locomotives the stoker was usually powered by a small steam engine located in the tender which drew its steam from the main boiler.

In early designs the coal would still be shovelled by the fireman into a hopper which would feed into a crusher and then a screw or bucket elevator would lift the pulverised coal to a position where it could be mechanically scattered across the burning coals of the furnace by a spreader. The spreader could be jets of steam, mechanical arms, or a fast rotating plate.

Later designs also mechanised the retrieval of the coal from the tender using steam ram powered pushers and/or a helical screw.

Some notable types
This used a system of paddles to push coal forward and it was fed into the firebox at grate level.
The Street type, consisted of a coal crusher, hand-fed by the fireman, that was fitted to the front left hand side of the tender footplate and driven by a small steam engine mounted behind the hand brake column. The crushed coal then fell by gravity into a chute which led to a receiving bin that was fitted below the back buffer beam of the locomotive, from where it was picked up by a bucket elevator travelling in large tubes. The full buckets were carried up in the left hand side tube mounted on the back of the firebox, discharged into a central receiver and then travelled down the right hand side tube.
The Duplex type was manufactured by the Locomotive Stoker Company, Pittsburgh, PA. It used a screw feed to bring coal forward from the tender, and then two vertical screw feeds to raise it into the left and right hand sides of the firebox.

References

Steam locomotive technologies
Locomotive parts
Train-related introductions in 1905